Donald Pellmann (August 12, 1915 – October 11, 2020) was an American centenarian multi world-record-setting masters athlete. He held the current M90 world record (for men aged 90 or above) in the long jump, high jump, discus throw, and indoor pole vault. Additionally, he also held the American records in the 100 metres, triple jump, shot put, and javelin throw. He lived in an assisted senior living facility in Santa Clara, California.

Biography
Born in Milwaukee, Wisconsin, he grew up during the Great Depression. He had high jumped in high school, where he claimed he was "not great," but work soon took priority. He was a tool and die maker and remained at work during World War II. In 1970, he retired from his job at a subsidiary of General Electric. Other than occasional bowling, softball and golf, he was not involved in athletics for 58 years. Meanwhile, he watched his more athletic friends from the football team have failing ankles, knees and hearts. Pellmann never had those kinds of ailments.

On September 20, 2015, Pellmann set five world records at the San Diego Senior Games. Competing in the 100 and older category, he ran the 100-meter dash in 26.99 seconds, beating the previous age-group world record held by Japan's Hidekichi Miyazaki by 2.84 seconds. Pellmann became the first centenarian to clear an official height in the high jump. Pellmann also set records in the shot put, discus throw and long jump. Later that week, Pellmann was named USATF "Athlete of the Week".

In 2018, his wife Marge died, with whom he had been married for 71 years. In September 2020, Pellmann had hip surgery performed on him after a bad fall. On October 11, 2020, Pellmann died aged 105.

In 2020 he was voted to the USATF Masters Hall of Fame.

Additional 
List of centenarian masters track and field athletes

References

External links
 interview with Donald Pellmann

1915 births
2020 deaths
American centenarians
American masters athletes
American male javelin throwers
American male pole vaulters
American male discus throwers
American male shot putters
American male high jumpers
American male long jumpers
American male sprinters
Men centenarians
Track and field athletes from Milwaukee
World record holders in masters athletics